The Bliha Falls (or ), called by locals Blihin Skok ( or ), is a waterfall on the Bliha river located near Fajtovci, 14 kilometers west of Sanski Most, Bosnia and Herzegovina. At this point, the water of the Bliha drops from 56 meters high cliff. It is designated a natural monument since 1965.

Legends surrounding it
There is an Illyrian legend surrounding the Bliha falls; 
All of humanity, except for a brother and two sisters was wiped out. To continue mankind, the three had to have children together. One of the sisters, named Bliha, was so sad because her brother had impregnated her that she jumped off a cliff, and turned into the river, which created this waterfall, promptly named "Bliha's jump."
The other sister turned into tears, and she now flows through Sanski Most quietly.

See also
 List of rivers of Bosnia and Herzegovina

References

Waterfalls of Bosnia and Herzegovina
Natural monuments